The Germany women's national under-21 football team represents the female under-21s of Germany and is controlled by the German Football Association, the governing body of football in Germany. The team has not been active since 2006.

External links
 Under-21 national team at the German Football Association

Under-21
Youth football in Germany
Women's national under-21 association football teams
European women's national under-21 association football teams